Luanvi is a Spanish sportswear manufacturer, which currently produces equipment and apparel for football, basketball, handball and volleyball. Its headquarters are located in the city of Paterna, Spain.

Sponsorships

Basketball

National teams

Club teams

Europe

 Valencia
 Valladolid
 Gipuzkoa BC
 Ikaros Chalkida BC
 P.A.O.K.
 All Star Vicenza
 Budućnost Podgorica
 Zabok

America

  Santeros de Aguada
  Leones de Ponce
  Indios de Mayagüez
  Brujos de Guayama
  Caciques de Humacao
  Capitanes de Arecibo 
  Atléticos de San Germán 
  Vaqueros de Bayamón 
  Piratas de Quebradillas 
  Cangrejeros de Santurce
  Atenienses de Manatí

Beach Soccer

Club teams

Europe

 Viareggio

Football

National teams

 Uruguay  (Women) (Since 2016)

Club teams

Africa

  O Medea
  Vita Club   (From 2022 - 2023 season)
  Leones Vegetarianos FC
  LPS Tozeur

America
  Quilmes (from 2022)
  San Martín de Tucumán 
  Deportes Concepción
  Club Atlético Cerro

Europe

 Encamp
 Saldus SS/Leevon – (2019–present)
 Panionios F.C. – (2016–present)
 Volos N.F.C.
 FC Tirsense – (2015–present)
 Leixões S.C. – Portugal
 OFK Dunajská Lužná – (2014–present)
 FC ViOn Zlaté Moravce – (2013–2014)
 MFK Lokomotíva Zvolen – (2014–present)
 CP Cacereño
 Caudal Deportivo
 UB Conquense
 Ontinyent CF
 Polideportivo Ejido
 Barbate CF
 Real Jaén
 Saltängens BK

Former teams

  FC Andorra
 CF Badalona
  Valencia CF
  Villarreal CF
  Real Zaragoza
  Albacete Balompié
  Montevideo City Torque
  Levante UD
  Granada CF
  CD Tenerife
  Newell's Old Boys
  San Lorenzo de Almagro
  Leixões

Futsal

Club teams
Burnley national futsal association youth set up, in association also with panasonic and annsummers.com

Europe

ARCD Mendiga

Handball

Club teams
 Steaua București
 BM Antequera
 BM Huesca
 Indeco Conversano

References

External links
Luanvi Official Site

Sporting goods manufacturers of Spain
Sportswear brands
Paterna